Brentidae is a cosmopolitan family of primarily xylophagous beetles also known as straight-snouted weevils. The concept of this family has been recently expanded with the inclusion of three groups formerly placed in the Curculionidae; the subfamilies Apioninae, Cyladinae, and Nanophyinae, as well as the Ithycerinae, previously considered a separate family. They are most diverse in the tropics, but occur throughout the temperate regions of the world. They are among the families of weevils that have non-elbowed antennae, and tend to be elongate and flattened, though there are numerous exceptions.

The subfamilial classification of the family has been reorganized by several different authors within the last 20 years, and is not yet stable; the most recent, and conservative, classification (Oberprieler et al., 2007) accepts only 6 subfamilies, with many familiar subfamilial taxa (e.g., Antliarhininae, Cyladinae, Cyphagoginae, Myrmacicelinae and Trachelizinae) now relegated to the corresponding tribal groups, Antliarhinini, Cyladini, Cyphagogini, Myrmacicelini and Trachelizini, primarily within the subfamily Brentinae.

See also
 Acratini

References 

 Oberprieler, R. G.; Marvaldi, A. E.; Anderson, R. S. 2007: Weevils, weevils, weevils everywhere. pp. 491–520 in: Zhang, Z.-Q. & Shear, W. A. (Eds) Linnaeus tercentenary: progress in invertebrate taxonomy. Zootaxa, 1668: 1–766.

External links
 Images of Brentidae species found in New Zealand
 Brentinae - primitive Weevils of Florida on the University of Florida / Institute of Food and Agricultural Sciences Featured Creatures website
 

 
Beetle families
Articles containing video clips